"All My Rowdy Friends Are Coming Over Tonight" is a song written and recorded by American musician Hank Williams Jr. It was released in October 1984 as the second single from his album Major Moves. It peaked at number ten on the country music charts. From 1989 to 2011, Williams performed a version of the song (reworked as "All My Rowdy Friends Are Here on Monday Night") as the opening theme to Monday Night Football. The song was reinstated in 2017, with a new version by Williams Jr., Florida Georgia Line and Jason Derulo.

Music video
Directed by John Goodhue, the music video for the song features artists such as George Jones driving a riding mower; Willie Nelson and Waylon Jennings playing poker; Little Jimmy Dickens and Paul Williams carrying a keg of beer; Cheech & Chong stumbling out of a smoke-filled limousine; William Lee Golden (of The Oak Ridge Boys) hitchhiking; Duane Allen (The Oak Ridge Boys) as a chauffeur; and George Thorogood entertaining other celebrities like Mel Tillis, Kris Kristofferson, Grandpa Jones, Porter Wagoner, Jim Varney,  at Hank Jr.'s "party pad out in the woods." At the end of the video, a ghostly Cadillac flies into the night sky, referencing the fact that his father, Hank Williams, died while riding in a Cadillac.

Single and album versions
The album version is different from the single (and video) version, which changes the lines "ready to get the summer/summertime started" in the last two choruses to "ready to get the music started" in the second chorus and "c'mon and get your motor started" in the final chorus.

Commercial and critical success
The single would go on to become one of Williams' signature songs (thanks to Monday Night Football) and became his 26th career Top 10 single on the Billboard Hot Country Singles & Tracks chart. It also garnered a number of prestigious music industry awards and nominations. The music video became the inaugural winner for both the Country Music Association and Academy of Country Music Music Video of the Year award. Williams' vocal performance earned him a nomination for Country Music Association Awards as well as Grammy Award nominations for Grammy Awards for Best Country Song and Grammy Award for Best Male Country Vocal Performance in 1985.

Chart performance

References

1984 singles
Hank Williams Jr. songs
National Football League music
ABC Sports
ESPN
Songs written by Hank Williams Jr.
Song recordings produced by Jimmy Bowen
Warner Records singles
Curb Records singles
Blues rock songs
1984 songs